Property Ladder is the original British version of the television series Property Ladder which ran for 7 series between 2001 and 2009. Hosted by Sarah Beeny, it follows the journey of amateur property developers as they set out to make a life changing profit from renovating challenging houses.

The show underwent a change in format during 2004, featuring two developments per episode rather than one. In early 2009, Channel 4 announced that a new series, re-titled Property Snakes and Ladders, would be broadcast. The first to be filmed in a struggling market, ultimately it was the final series broadcast.

In 2012, Beeny returned to the format to host Double Your House for Half The Money, which follows two sets of home owners renovating their own homes rather than developing them to sell.

References

External links
Property Ladder at Channel4.com

2001 British television series debuts
2009 British television series endings
Channel 4 original programming
Home renovation television series
Property buying television shows
Television series by Fremantle (company)
English-language television shows